is a consumer electronics retailer chain in Japan. Currently, it has 41 stores in Japan. Bic Camera has a 50% ownership of former rival store Kojima and full ownership of computer store chain Sofmap.

As of 2018, Bic Camera is the third largest electronics and home appliance retailer, behind Yamada Denki and Edion.

History
In 1968,  founded  in Takasaki, Gunma Prefecture. Four years later, the camera sales department was separated from the company and renamed . In 1978, Bic Color was renamed Bic Camera, with their first store opening in Ikebukuro, Tokyo. Originally specializing in selling cameras at discount prices, Bic Camera expanded to selling home appliances, personal computers, alcoholic beverages, golf equipment, bedding, luxury brand products, bicycles, and toys.

Following a decline in PC sales, this subsidiary was absorbed back into the company in 2000. Nippon BS Broadcasting Corp. was established in 1999, with Bic Camera as its majority shareholder. In 1995, Bic Camera displayed banners protesting France's nuclear weapons testing in the South Pacific.

As part of its expansion, Bic Camera purchased Sogo's Yūrakuchō building in 2001. Throughout the 2000s, Bic Camera opened locations connected to JR stations across the country. In 2005, Bic Camera moved its headquarters from Nishi-Ikebukuro to Takada. A year later, the company purchased Sofmap in February and had itself listed in the JASDAQ Securities Exchange on August 10. In September, Bic Camera purchased a 3.2% stake in Tokyo Broadcasting System. On October 5, 2007, Bic Camera acquired a 9.33% share of rival Best Denki and increased its stake to 14.95%. On June 10, 2008, the company was listed on the Tokyo Stock Exchange and had itself delisted from JASDAQ on August 29. In 2009, Bic Camera was fined 1.3 million by the TSE for falsifying its earnings after its shares lost half its value early that year. As a result, Arai stepped down as chairman and the company was delisted from the TSE. Sofmap was delisted on January 26, 2010 after becoming a wholly owned subsidiary of Bic Camera. In June 2010, Bic Camera absorbed rival Sakuraya.

On June 26, 2012, Bic Camera purchased 50% of rival store chain Kojima. As a result of the Kojima acquisition, Best Denki split from Bic Camera and was fully acquired by Yamada Denki on July 13. On September 1, Arai was reinstated as chairman. In April 2016, Bic Camera opened its first  branch at Haneda Airport. Air Bic Camera also has locations at Narita International Airport, Chubu Centrair International Airport, and Naha Airport, as well as two branches in Odaiba.

On December 19, Bic Camera partnered with Rakuten to launch . In 2018, Bic Camera reported record profits and a 50% increase in shares as a result of a rise in Chinese tourists and the store chain's acceptance of Alipay and WeChat.

On February 7, 2020, Bic Camera opened its Nihonbashi Kaden branch in partnership with Mitsukoshi.

Stores
Bic Camera has 60 stores in the Kantō region (26 in Tokyo, seven in Kanagawa, two in Saitama, and three in Chiba). Outside the Kantō region, there is one store in Hokkaido, one in Niigata, one in Gunma, one in Ibaraki, two in Shizuoka, five in Aichi, two in Kyoto, four in Osaka, one in Okayama, one in Hiroshima, one in Fukuoka, one in Kagoshima, and one in Okinawa. This includes BICQLO, shared branches with Kojima, and Air Bic Camera. The largest store is the Yūrakuchō Honkan branch in Tokyo.

Commercials and jingles

Bic Camera's theme song 
Bic Camera has its own jingle titled , which is used in TV commercials and broadcast within the stores. The jingle's melody is loosely based on the enka song , which, in turn, traces its roots to the American hymn "Shall We Gather at the River?". The song's original lyrics for the main branch in Ikebukuro reference the Ikebukuro Station, the Seibu Ikebukuro Line by the east exit and the Tōbu Tōjō Line by the west exit. The lyrics are changed for specific branches such as BICQLO.

References

External links

Japanese brands
Japanese companies established in 1968
Companies listed on the Tokyo Stock Exchange
Consumer electronics retailers of Japan
Photographic retailers
Photography companies of Japan
Retail companies based in Tokyo
Retail companies established in 1968